Charles Wanne Fox (born 6 April 1948) is a former breaststroke and medley swimmer. He competed in two events at the 1964 Summer Olympics representing Northern Rhodesia.

References

External links
 

1948 births
Living people
Northern Rhodesia people
Zambian male breaststroke swimmers
Zambian male medley swimmers
Olympic swimmers of Northern Rhodesia
Swimmers at the 1964 Summer Olympics
Place of birth missing (living people)